The 2018 Grand Prix de Fourmies was the 86th edition of the Grand Prix de Fourmies road cycling one day race. It was held on 2 September 2018 as part of UCI Europe Tour in category 1.HC.

Teams
Twenty-two teams entered the race. Each team had a maximum of seven riders:

Result

References

2018 UCI Europe Tour
2018 in French sport
Grand Prix de Fourmies